The 2002–03 season is Hyderabad cricket team's 69th competitive season. The Hyderabad cricket team is senior men's domestic cricket team based in the city of Hyderabad, India, run by the Hyderabad Cricket Association. They represent the region of Telangana in the state of Andhra Pradesh in domestic competitions.

Competition Overview

Squads

 Irani Cup
Rayudu got selected to the Rest of India squad for the 2002 Irani Cup, a first-class cricket competition in India.

Deodhar Trophy
Rayudu, Vinay Kumar and Arjun got selected to the South Zone squad for the 2002-03 Deodhar Trophy, a List-A cricket competition in India.

Duleep Trophy
Manohar got selected to the Elite–A squad while Arjun got selected to the Elite–B squad for the 2002–03 Duleep Trophy, a first-class cricket tournament in India.

Ranji Trophy

The Hyderabad team, led by Venkatapathy Raju, began their campaign in the Ranji Trophy, the premier first-class cricket tournament in India, with a loss against the Mumbai at Hyderabad on 9 November 2002. They finished fourth in Group A of the Elite Group and failed to qualify for the knockout stage with a win, two losses and four draws. The teenage sensation, Ambati Rayudu emerged as the second highest run-getter by the end of the elite group-stage.

Points Table
Elite Group A

  Top two teams advanced to the knockout stage.
  Bottom team relegated to the Plate Group for the 2003–04 Ranji Trophy.
 Points system : Win by an innings or 10 wickets = 3, Win = 2, Draw with first innings lead = 1, No Result = 0, Draw with first innings deficit = 0, Loss = 0.

Matches
Group Stage

Statistics
Most runs

 Source: Cricinfo
Most wickets

 Source: Cricinfo

Ranji One–Day Trophy
The Hyderabad team, led by Venkatapathy Raju, began their campaign in the Subbaiah Pillai Trophy as part of the South Zone Ranji One–Day Trophy, a List-A cricket tournament in India, with a loss against the Tamil Nadu at Bangalore on 6 December 2002. The partnership from Arjun Yadav and Devishetty Vinay Kumar helped the Hyderabad to a slow recovery from the initial collapse but wickets at the end restricted them to 205 while the century from Sridharan Sriram completed the chase for the Tamil Nadu with six-wickets to spare. In the second match, the five-wicket haul from Inder Shekar Reddy helped the Hyderabad bowl out the Karnataka to 120. The Hyderabad suffered an initial collapse at the chase but an unbeaten 45-run knock from Vinay Kumar guided the Hyderabad win by four wickets. In the third match, the three-wicket by Mohammad Nadeemuddin triggered the initial collapse and helped the Hyderabad restrict the Andhra to 210 while the century from Tirumalasetti Suman along with the half-century from Ambati Rayudu helped the Hyderabad complete the chase with seven-wickets to spare. The Hyderabad defeated the Goa by three wickets in their fourth match of the tournament after the half-centuries from Suman and Vinay Kumar helped the Hyderabad chase the target of 268 set by the Goa with the help of 89-run knock from Swapnil Asnodkar. In the final zonal match, the century from Sujith Somasunder along with the half-century from Hemanth Kumar helped the Kerala set the target of 298 while the three-wicket haul from K. N. Ananthapadmanabhan bowled the Hyderabad out for 247 despite 98-run knock from Vinay Kumar and another half-century from Ibrahim Khaleel. This loss resulted in the Hyderabad finish third in South Zone and fail to qualify for the Ranji ODI Championship with three wins and two losses.

Points Table
South Zone

Matches
Zonal Stage

Statistics
Most runs

 Source: Cricinfo
Most wickets

 Source: Cricinfo

See also
 Hyderabad cricket team
 Hyderabad Cricket Association

References

External links
Hyderabad cricket team official site

Cricket in Hyderabad, India
Cricket in Telangana
Sport in Telangana